SiMERR Australia is an Australia-wide research body. Its National Centre is located at the University of New England, Armidale, NSW, Australia.

SiMERR Australia's main goal is to improve learning outcomes for students in regional and rural areas, particularly in the areas of science, mathematics and Information and Communication Technology (ICT).

History
The National Centre of Science, ICT, and Mathematics Education for Regional and Rural Australia (SiMERR) grew out of the Centre for Cognition Research into Learning and Teaching (CRiLT), which was part of the School of Education at the University of New England. Unlike CRiLT, SiMERR focused on the curriculum areas of science, mathematics and ICT.

SiMERR opened its doors on 1 July 2004, with branches, or hubs opening in each state of Australia in the twelve months that followed in partnership universities, such as the University of Tasmania and the Deakin University in Victoria.

The SiMERR National summit in 2005 brought together educators and other stakeholders for the first national meeting of its kind since the National Centre opening. The two-day summit brought together people from diverse bodies, such as teacher associations, Federal Government departments, universities, parent groups and educational authorities. Delegates discussed ways in which the educational disadvantage experienced by students in rural and regional areas may be addressed

Structure
SiMERR Australia consists of a series of hubs located in each state in Australia.

Aims
SiMERR Australia's vision is to work to improve outcomes for students in science, ICT and mathematics so that:
 Parents can send their children to rural and regional schools and know they will experience equal opportunities for a quality education;
Students can attend rural or regional schools and realise their academic potential in Science, ICT and Mathematics; and
Teachers can work in rural and regional schools and be professionally connected and supported.

See also
 QuickSmart academic skills program developed by SiMERR

References

Scientific organisations based in Australia
Information technology education